Mohammad Fakhri bin Ismail (born 6 March 1991) is a Bruneian sprinter and footballer, playing as a striker for Indera SC. He represented his nation Brunei in the men's 100 metres at the 2015 IAAF World Championships in Beijing, China and at the 2016 Summer Olympics in Rio de Janeiro, Brazil. Ismail also boasted a national record of 10.59 seconds, which he registered at the 2015 Southeast Asian Games in Singapore.

Athletics career
At the 2016 Summer Olympics, Fakhri competed for the Bruneian team in the men's 100 metres. He posted a time of 10.92 seconds to progress further from the prelims as one of the eight fastest sprinters of the field, before rounding out the first of eight heats in ninth place with a 10.95, almost half a second shy of his personal best. He also served as Brunei's flag bearer during the parade of nations segment of the opening ceremony.

Football career

Fakhri was previously a goal-getter for lesser Bruneian clubs like DST FC and IKLS FC. In the second half of the 2018-19 Brunei Super League season, Indera SC signed Fakhri to bolster their striking options, to replace departing Indonesian forward Iner Sontany Putra.

Fakhri scored his first two goals for Indera against Rimba Star FC on 28 February 2020 in a 9–0 win.

See also
 Brunei at the 2015 World Championships in Athletics
 Brunei at the 2016 Summer Olympics

References

External links

1991 births
Living people
Place of birth missing (living people)
Association football forwards
Bruneian footballers
Indera SC players
Bruneian male sprinters
Olympic athletes of Brunei
World Athletics Championships athletes for Brunei
Athletes (track and field) at the 2016 Summer Olympics
Athletes (track and field) at the 2018 Asian Games
Asian Games competitors for Brunei